This article concerns the period 899 BC – 890 BC.

Events and trends
 899 BC—The first year of King Yih of Zhou's reign is marked by a solar eclipse.
892 BC—Megacles, King of Athens, dies after a reign of 30 years and is succeeded by his son Diognetus.
 892 BC—King Xiao of Zhou overthrows King Yih of Zhou and takes the throne.
 891 BC—Tukulti-Ninurta II succeeds his father Adad-nirari II as king of Assyria.